Frank Froggatt (21 March 1898–1944) was an English footballer who played in the Football League for Chesterfield, Notts County and Sheffield Wednesday. His son, Redfern, and nephew, Jack were also professional footballers.

References

1898 births
1944 deaths
English footballers
Association football midfielders
English Football League players
Attercliffe F.C. players
Denaby United F.C. players
Worksop Town F.C. players
Sheffield Wednesday F.C. players
Notts County F.C. players
Chesterfield F.C. players
Scarborough F.C. players
Manchester North End F.C. players